This is a list of Canadian musicians. Only notable individuals appear here; bands are listed at List of bands from Canada.

0-9
347aidan - rapper

A

Lee Aaron – jazz and rock singer-songwriter, also known as "Metal Queen"
Abdominal – hip-hop musician
Adaline – singer-songwriter
Bryan Adams – singer-songwriter
Bernard Adamus – singer-songwriter
Susan Aglukark – folk-pop singer-songwriter
AHI – folk singer-songwriter
Lydia Ainsworth – composer/singer
Bruce Aitken – jazz and rock drummer
Robert Aitken – composer, flute player
Chuckie Akenz – rapper, songwriter
Pierrette Alarie – opera singer
Emma Albani – opera singer
Coco Love Alcorn – pop singer
John Alcorn – jazz singer
Don Alder – fingerstyle guitarist, singer-songwriter, composer
Toya Alexis – R&B singer
Madeleine Allakariallak – Inuit throat singer, folk singer
Chad Allan – singer (the Guess Who)
Andrew Allen – singer
John P. Allen – bluegrass, country and rock fiddler
Lillian Allen – dub poet
Archie Alleyne – jazz drummer
a l l i e - R&B singer
Allie X – singer-songwriter
Tommy Alto – indie rock singer-songwriter
Don Amero – singer-songwriter
Barbra Amesbury – singer-songwriter
Ammoye – reggae singer
Amylie – pop singer-songwriter
Anachnid – pop/electronic singer-songwriter
Charlie Angus – alternative country singer-songwriter, writer, politician
Paul Anka – singer-songwriter, 1950s pop star
Matt Andersen – singer-songwriter
Kerri Anderson – pop singer
James Anthony – blues guitarist
Tafari Anthony – rhythm and blues singer
Alan Anton – bassist (Cowboy Junkies)
Natalie Appleton – singer (All Saints)
Violet Archer – composer
Jann Arden – pop singer-songwriter
Carolyn Arends – Contemporary Christian pop singer
Susie Arioli – jazz singer
Julian Armour – cellist
John Arpin – pianist, composer, recording artist, entertainer
Marie-Pierre Arthur – pop singer-songwriter
Talena Atfield – bassist (Kittie)
Athésia – pop/dance singer
Allison Au – jazz saxophonist
Rich Aucoin – indie rock singer-songwriter
Melissa Auf der Maur – rock bassist (Hole, the Smashing Pumpkins)
Shawn Austin – country singer and songwriter
Eva Avila – singer (winner of Canadian Idol, 2006)
Mike Ayley – singer, bass guitarist
Jay Aymar – guitarist and singer-songwriter
Marcel Aymar – singer-songwriter
Aysanabee - singer-songwriter
Caroline Azar – singer-songwriter, keyboardist (Fifth Column)

B

Sebastian Bach – rock singer
Randy Bachman – rock singer, guitarist
Tal Bachman – singer (son of Randy Bachman)
Back Alley John – blues singer-songwriter, harmonica player
Backxwash – rapper
Bad News Brown – rapper
Bahamas – folk singer-guitarist
Jason Bajada – singer-songwriter
Carroll Baker – country music singer
Tim Baker – indie rock singer-songwriter
James Baley – rhythm and blues/dance singer 
Gord Bamford – country singer
Buddy Banks – jazz double-bassist
Del Barber – singer-songwriter
Steve Barakatt – composer-pianist
Jill Barber – singer-songwriter
Matthew Barber – singer-songwriter
Barlow – composer, rock
Emilie-Claire Barlow – singer-songwriter
Kim Barlow – singer-songwriter
Laura Barrett – singer-songwriter, kalimba player
Mary Barry – singer-songwriter, composer, pianist, jazz, blues, chanson
Yank Barry – rock singer, composer, guitar, percussion
Miguel de la Bastide – flamenco guitarist
Isabel Bayrakdarian – soprano
Kevin Bazinet – pop singer
Bobby Bazini – singer-songwriter
Gary Beals – R&B singer
Martin Beaver – violinist
Dany Bédar – singer-songwriter
Gabriela Bee – singer-songwriter
Jaymz Bee – singer, music director
Begonia — singer
Dan Bejar – singer-songwriter (Destroyer; Swan Lake; Hello, Blue Roses; the New Pornographers)
Daniel Bélanger – pop, electro, rock, ambience singer
Roz Bell – singer-songwriter
Steve Bell – guitarist, singer-songwriter
Clayton Bellamy – singer-songwriter
Belly – rapper, songwriter
Bbno$ – rapper, singer-songwriter
Quanteisha Benjamin – singer
Eli Bennett – saxophonist, composer
Willie P. Bennett – folk/alternative country singer-songwriter
Ridley Bent – country singer
Barney Bentall – rock singer-songwriter
Beppie – children's musician
Jennifer Berezan – singer-songwriter, producer
Moe Berg – singer-songwriter (Pursuit of Happiness)
Art Bergmann – punk/alternative singer-songwriter
Ruth Berhe – singer-songwriter
Camille Bernard – opera singer
Mario Bernardi – conductor, pianist
Geoff Berner – klezmer/folk accordionist, singer-songwriter
Larry Berrio – country singer-songwriter
Betty Moon – singer-songwriter
Salome Bey – blues/gospel/jazz singer
Amélie Beyries – pop singer-songwriter
Laila Biali – jazz singer/pianist
Ed Bickert – jazz guitarist
Charlie Biddle – jazz bassist
Dave Bidini – guitarist (Rheostatics)
Justin Bieber – pop singer-songwriter
Big Rude Jake – singer-songwriter, band leader, blues shouter, guitarist
Dan Bigras – singer-songwriter
Kim Bingham – rock/ska singer-songwriter
Heather Bishop – folk singer-songwriter
Jaydee Bixby – country singer
Annesley Black (born 1979) – composer
Gwendolyn Black – pianist, educator and activist
Jully Black – R&B musician
Stacey Blades – guitarist (L.A. Guns)
Jason Blaine – country singer
Jean-Michel Blais – composer and pianist
Forest Blakk - pop singer
Paul Bley – jazz pianist
Omar Blondahl – singer
George Blondheim – pianist, composer
Joe Bocan – pop singer
La Bolduc – singer-songwriter, harmonicist, violinist
Mars Bonfire - from Steppenwolf
Jonas Bonnetta – singer-songwriter
Bonky (Onno Borgen) – trance musician
Will Bonness - jazz pianist
Boogat – rapper
Dave Bookman – indie rock singer-songwriter
Brian Borcherdt – singer-songwriter
Boslen - rapper
Robi Botos – jazz pianist
John Bottomley – singer-songwriter
Isabelle Boulay – pop singer
Gerry Boulet – rock singer
Bill Bourne – folk/alternative singer-songwriter
Pierre Bouvier – singer-songwriter, guitarist (Reset, Simple Plan)
Mitch Bowden – rock singer, guitarist (Don Vail, the Priddle Concern, Chore)
Benjamin Bowman – violinist
Jimmy Bowskill – blues guitarist, bassist and singer
Liona Boyd – classical guitarist
Philippe Brach – singer-songwriter
David Bradstreet – singer-songwriter
Tim Brady – electric guitarist, composer, improviser, working in contemporary classical, experimental, musique actuelle
Andru Branch – singer-songwriter, keyboardist (Andru Branch, Halfway Tree)
Paul Brandt – country singer-songwriter
Russell Braun – operatic baritone
Lenny Breau – guitarist
Beverly Breckenridge – bassist (Fifth Column and Phono-Comb)
Michael Breen – pop/rock singer and guitarist
Dean Brody – country singer-songwriter
Lisa Brokop – country singer-songwriter
Michael Brook – guitarist, producer, film scorer
Jon Brooks – folk singer-songwriter
Colleen Brown – singer-songwriter
Divine Brown – R&B/soul singer
Edwin Orion Brownell – neo-classical composer, pianist
Chad Brownlee – country singer
Measha Brueggergosman – operatic soprano
Roxane Bruneau - pop singer
Paul Brunelle – country music guitarist, songwriter
Rod Bruno – singer-songwriter, guitarist
Billy Bryans – percussionist, record producer
Jon Bryant – singer-songwriter
Dan Bryk – singer-songwriter
Jim Bryson – singer-songwriter
Michael Bublé – singer
Buck 65 – hip-hop artist
Basia Bulat – singer-songwriter
George Burdi
Malcolm Burn – singer, record producer
Louise Burns – singer-songwriter
Jason Burnstick – folk singer-songwriter
Spencer Burton – indie rock and country singer-songwriter
Win Butler – member of Arcade Fire
Matthew Byrne – folk singer-songwriter

C

Meryn Cadell – rock singer-songwriter, performance artist
Cadence Weapon – rapper
Daniel Caesar – R&B, singer-songwriter
Buddy Cage – pedal steel guitar player
Shawna Cain – Christian R&B singer
Kathryn Calder – indie rock/pop singer-songwriter
John Allan Cameron – folk singer, guitarist
Steph Cameron – folk singer-songwriter
Cherie Camp – singer-songwriter
James Campbell – clarinetist
Torquil Campbell – singer-songwriter (Stars)
Brendan Canning – singer-songwriter (Broken Social Scene, Valley of the Giants)
Patricia Cano – jazz/Latin music singer and musical theatre actress
Lou Canon – singer-songwriter
George Canyon – country singer
Ben Caplan – folk musician
Alessia Cara – contemporary R&B
Craig Cardiff – singer-songwriter
Charlotte Cardin – pop singer
Celeigh Cardinal – singer-songwriter
Paul Cargnello – singer-songwriter
Marie Carmen – pop singer, musical theatre actor (Starmania)
Glory-Anne Carriere – country singer
Stef Carse — country and pop singer
Wilf Carter – country singer
Jazz Cartier – rapper
Andrew Cash – singer-songwriter
Peter Cash – singer-songwriter
Barbara Cass-Beggs – singer
Andrew Cassara – pop singer-songwriter
Ian Casselman – singer, drummer
Lou-Adriane Cassidy – pop singer-songwriter
Tory Cassis – folk and jazz singer
Micheal Castaldo – singer-songwriter, producer
France Castel – pop and blues singer, musical theatre actress
Jennifer Castle – singer-songwriter
Demo Cates - jazz/R&B saxophonist and singer
Rachel Cavalho – pianist, music educator
Cayouche – singer-songwriter
David Celia – singer-songwriter
CFCF – electronic musician
Chantal Chamandy – pop/dance singer-songwriter
Champion – DJ, electronic musician
Keshia Chanté – urban/R&B singer
Robert Charlebois – rock and funk singer
Chloe Charles – soul pop singer
Gregory Charles – chorister and pianist
Nuela Charles – soul/pop/R&B/hip hop singer
Tanika Charles – soul and rhythm and blues singer
Régine Chassagne - member of Arcade Fire
Checkmate – rapper
Vern Cheechoo - country singer-songwriter
Brad Cheeseman – jazz bassist and composer
Rita Chiarelli – blues singer
Jane Child – pop and rock dance artist, songwriter, producer
Choclair – hip-hop artist
Charlene Choi – pop singer in Hong Kong
Gina Choi – South Korean singer
Tommy Chong – guitarist (Bobby Taylor & the Vancouvers), comedian
Timothy Chooi – violinist
Christophe – pop singer
Jarvis Church – R&B singer-producer (real name Gerald Eaton)
Annabelle Chvostek – folk singer
Cikwes - traditional Cree music singer
Clairmont the Second – rapper
Terri Clark – country singer-songwriter
Alanna Clarke – pop/rock singer-songwriter
Classified – rapper
Renée Claude – singer
David Clayton-Thomas – singer
Jim Clench – bassist, vocalist (April Wine, Bachman–Turner Overdrive)
Kevin Closs – singer-songwriter
William Cloutier – pop singer
Tom Cochrane – singer-songwriter
Bruce Cockburn – singer-songwriter
Code Pie - indie-pop/rock
Leonard Cohen – singer-songwriter, poet
Cold Specks – soul singer
Holly Cole – jazz singer
Naida Cole – pianist
Raquel Cole – country pop singer-songwriter
Don Coleman – rock singer
Jason Collett – singer-songwriter (also member of Broken Social Scene)
Dorothy Collins – pop singer
Simon Collins – pop/electronic musician
Chuck Comeau – drummer (Reset, Simple Plan)
Ray Condo – rockabilly singer
Chantal Condor – singer
Tyler Connolly – singer-songwriter, guitarist (Theory of a Deadman)
Stompin' Tom Connors – country singer-songwriter
Jesse Cook – guitarist, producer, composer
Spirit Cool – live-looping acoustic guitarist, singer
Bill Coon - guitarist, composer
Jim Corcoran – singer-songwriter, radio personality
J. P. Cormier – singer, guitarist
Jacinta Cormier – singer, pianist
Louis-Jean Cormier – rock singer-songwriter 
Corneille – funk, R&B, soul singer-songwriter
Antoine Corriveau – singer-songwriter
Michel Corriveau - keyboardist, composer
Ève Cournoyer – pop and rock singer
Rose Cousins – singer-songwriter
Deborah Cox – pop/R&B singer
Jonny Craig – vocalist, songwriter, ex-front man for Dance Gavin Dance, front man for Emarosa and Isles and Glaciers
Sara Craig – singer-songwriter
Terri Crawford – rock singer, children's entertainer
Siobhan Crawley – pop singer
Jim Creeggan – singer-songwriter, member of the Barenaked Ladies and the Brothers Creeggan
Andy Creeggan – singer-songwriter, former member of the Barenaked Ladies and the Brothers Creeggan
CRi – electronic producer
Cold Specks (Ladan Hussein) – soul musician
Colin Cripps – rock guitarist, producer (Crash Vegas)
Julie Crochetière – singer-songwriter, pianist (jazz, pop, R&B, soul)
John Crossingham – rock singer (Raising the Fawn)
Allison Crowe – singer-songwriter
Alex Cuba – jazz/pop singer-songwriter
Jim Cuddy – rock singer (Blue Rodeo)
Eliana Cuevas – jazz/Latin singer
Lori Cullen – pop/jazz singer
Burton Cummings – rock musician (the Guess Who, solo artist)
Chris Cummings – country singer-songwriter
Amelia Curran – singer-songwriter
Andy Curran – rock singer and bassist
Bobby Curtola – singer
Isabelle Cyr – singer

D
Dax – rapper
Ryan Dahle – guitarist (Limblifter) 
Lisa Dalbello – singer-songwriter
Sean Dalton – drummer (the Trews)
France D'Amour – singer-songwriter
Leah Daniels – country singer-songwriter
Rick Danko – bassist, violinist, guitarist, singer (the Band)
Mychael Danna – film composer
D'Ari – rock singer-songwriter
Datsik – dubstep artist
Benoît David – singer (Mystery)
Marie Davidson – EDM singer and producer
Mark Davis – singer-songwriter
Stu Davis – singer-songwriter, guitarist
Tanya Davis – singer-songwriter, poet
Desirée Dawson – singer-songwriter, ukulele player
Sophie Day – jazz singer
Luc de Larochellière – singer-songwriter
deadmau5 – house artist, electronic music producer, real name Joel Zimmerman
Aselin Debison – Celtic pop
Art d'Ecco – indie rock, glam rock singer
Tony Dekker – folk rock singer-songwriter (Great Lake Swimmers)
Gordon Delamont – big-band conductor, arranger, teacher
Helena Deland – singer-songwriter
Mac DeMarco – indie rock musician
Kris Demeanor – singer-songwriter
Simone Denny – dance/house/pop/techno singer
Gisela Depkat – cellist
Richard Desjardins – singer
Shawn Desman – pop, R&B singer
Lorraine Desmarais – jazz pianist, composer
Dave "Rave" Desroches – singer-songwriter (Teenage Head, the Dave Rave Conspiracy)
David Desrosiers – bassist, singer (Reset, Simple Plan)
Marie-Michèle Desrosiers – pop and rock singer
Angela Desveaux – singer-songwriter
Devon – rapper
Devours – electronic musician
Alpha Yaya Diallo – guitarist, composer
Scott Dibble – singer-songwriter (Scott Dibble and Watertown)
Steffi DiDomenicantonio – pop singer, musical theatre actress 
DijahSB – rapper
Hugh Dillon – frontman of Headstones and Hugh Dillon Redemption Choir
Natalie Di Luccio – singer, soprano
Céline Dion – pop singer
Carl Dixon – singer-songwriter, guitarist
DL Incognito – rapper
Melanie Doane – guitarist, singer
Bonnie Dobson – singer-songwriter, guitarist
Fefe Dobson – singer-songwriter
Dr. Draw – electronic violinist, composer
Denny Doherty – singer (the Mamas & the Papas)
Julie Doiron – singer-songwriter
Luke Doucet – singer-songwriter
Jerry Doucette – guitarist, singer-songwriter
Gordon Downie – singer (Tragically Hip)
Aaryn Doyle – rapper, singer-songwriter
Alan Doyle – singer, guitarist (Great Big Sea)
Damhnait Doyle – pop singer-songwriter
Drake – rapper, singer, actor 
Kevin Drew – guitarist, singer-songwriter
Glen Drover – guitarist (Megadeth, Eidolon)
Shawn Drover – drummer (Megadeth, Eidolon)
Ian D'Sa – songwriter, vocalist, guitarist (Billy Talent)
Dubmatix – reggae/electronic musician
Claude Dubois – pop singer-songwriter, musical theatre actor
Martin Dubreuil – tambourinist (Les Breastfeeders)
Annette Ducharme – singer, songwriter
Armond Duck Chief – country singer-songwriter
Victoria Duffield – singer-songwriter
Dumas – Québécois singer
Kyle Bobby Dunn – composer, musician, live performer
Élie Dupuis – singer, pianist
Shae Dupuy – country singer-songwriter
Melanie Durrant – R&B singer
Bill Durst – guitarist (Thundermug)
Matt Dusk – jazz singer-songwriter
Jeremy Dutcher – singer
DVBBS – DJ, producer
Phil Dwyer – jazz saxophonist
Jesse Aaron Dwyre – drummer
Howard Dyck – conductor, broadcaster
Félix Dyotte – singer-songwriter

E

Fred Eaglesmith – alternative country singer-songwriter
Jade Eagleson – country music singer-songwriter
 Eddie Eastman – country music singer-songwriter, Juno Award winner
Chris Eaton – indie rock singer-songwriter
Gerald Eaton – R&B singer, producer (known as Jarvis Church)
Mike Edel – folk musician & guitarist
Jerry Edmonton – drummer (Steppenwolf); his brother wrote "Born to Be Wild" under the pseudonym Mars Bonfire
Kathleen Edwards – singer-songwriter
Efajemue – jazz drummer
Coral Egan – pop, jazz singer
James Ehnes – violin virtuoso
Eightcubed – electronic artist
Shirley Eikhard – singer-songwriter (known for Something to Talk About)
Elisapie – pop singer
Peter Elkas – singer-songwriter
Lindsay Ell – country singer
Emanuel – rhythm and blues singer
Emma-Lee – singer-songwriter, photographer
Rik Emmett – singer-songwriter (former member of Triumph)
Ariel Engle – indie pop singer (Broken Social Scene, La Force)
Matt Epp – singer-songwriter
Quique Escamilla – singer-songwriter 
Esthero – singer-songwriter
Elise Estrada – pop singer
Emmalyn Estrada – pop singer (G.R.L)
Eternia – rapper
Quin Etheridge-Pedden – fiddler
Andre Ethier – rock singer-songwriter
Eric Ethridge – country singer-songwriter
Christine Evans – singer
George Evans – jazz vocalist
Gil Evans – pianist, arranger
Kellylee Evans – jazz/soul vocalist
Eva Everything – New Wave pop singer, television composer
Mike Evin – pop singer-songwriter
Excision – dubstep artist
Bob Ezrin – musician, producer of The Wall by Pink Floyd

F

Andrew F – singer-songwriter, pop rock singer
Lara Fabian – pop singer
Eria Fachin – dance/pop singer
Julie Fader – folk-pop singer-songwriter, keyboardist
Bruce Fairbairn – musician, rock band producer (Aerosmith, Bon Jovi, Loverboy)
Percy Faith – composer
Famous – rapper
Todd Fancey – bassist (the New Pornographers), singer-songwriter
Faouzia – singer-songwriter, musician
Mylène Farmer – singer
Robert Farnon - arranger, composer, conductor
Stephen Fearing – singer-songwriter
Leslie Feist – pop singer-songwriter
Christine Fellows – folk-pop singer-songwriter
Kate Fenner – singer-songwriter
Jay Ferguson – power pop singer-songwriter, guitarist (Sloan)
Maynard Ferguson – jazz band leader, trumpet
Danny Fernandes – pop singer
Ferron – folk singer-songwriter
Michael Feuerstack – singer-songwriter, guitarist (Wooden Stars, Snailhouse)
Janina Fialkowska – pianist
Dominique Fils-Aimé – jazz, rhythm and blues singer
Hank Fisher, known as Washboard Hank, singer-songwriter and multi-instrument entertainer
Jeremy Fisher – singer-songwriter
Brent Fitz – drummer, pianist (Slash, Theory of a Deadman, Alice Cooper, Vince Neil, Union)
Warren Dean Flandez – R&B, gospel singer
Jon-Rae Fletcher – rock singer-songwriter
Luca Fogale –- pop singer
Peter Foldy – singer-songwriter
Sue Foley – blues singer-songwriter
Roy Forbes – folk music singer-songwriter
Frazey Ford – folk music guitarist, singer-songwriter (the Be Good Tanyas)
Angel Forrest – singer
Maureen Forrester – contralto
Judith Forst – operatic mezzo-soprano
Amanda Forsyth – cellist
Marc Fortier – singer-songwriter, EPIC guitarist
Fred Fortin – rock singer-songwriter, guitarist, drummer
J.D. Fortune – former INXS lead singer
David Foster – composer, producer, pianist, vocalist
FouKi – rapper
Jeanick Fournier – singer, Canada's Got Talent season 2 winner
George Fox – country singer-songwriter
Foxtrott – electronic/indie pop musician
David Francey – folk singer-songwriter
Angelique Francis – blues singer
Frankenstein – rapper and record producer
Allan Fraser – folk singer-songwriter (formerly of Fraser & DeBolt)
Matt Frenette – drummer (Headpins, Loverboy, Streetheart)
Fresh I.E. – Christian rapper
Alan Frew – singer-songwriter (Glass Tiger)
Allen Froese – contemporary Christian singer
Lily Frost – singer/songwriter/performer and recording artist
Rhys Fulber – electronic musician/producer, Front Line Assembly, Delerium, Conjure One
Aaron Funk – breakcore artist
Lewis Furey – rock singer-songwriter, film music composer
Nelly Furtado – R&B/pop singer-songwriter, record producer, actress

G
B. B. Gabor – new wave artist
André Gagnon – pianist, composer
John Harvey Gahan – violinist
Jonathan Gallant – bassist (Billy Talent)
Lennie Gallant – singer-songwriter
Patsy Gallant – singer
Edward Gamblin – singer-songwriter
Yoan Garneau – singer-songwriter
Gale Garnett – singer-songwriter of the 1964 Top 10 Hit "We'll Sing in the Sunshine"
Garou – singer
Amos Garrett – guitarist, singer
Ali Gatie – singer-songwriter
Nadia Gaudet – folk singer-songwriter
Karina Gauvin – soprano
Eric Genuis – composer, pianist
Hannah Georgas – singer-songwriter
Jian Ghomeshi – singer, broadcaster, writer, producer
Joel Gibb – singer-songwriter (the Hidden Cameras)
Tim Gilbertson – singer-songwriter
Nick Gilder – singer-songwriter, "Hot Child in the City"
Flora Gionest – singer-songwriter
Fernande Giroux – jazz singer
Martin Giroux – singer
Alice Glass – lyricist, vocalist (Crystal Castles)
Greg Godovitz – singer, bass guitarist
Gary Pig Gold – singer-songwriter, guitarist (Dave Rave), producer (Simply Saucer)
Roxanne Goldade – country singer
Rose Goldblatt – pianist
Kat Goldman – singer-songwriter
Anthony Gomes – guitarist, singer-songwriter
Adam Gontier – singer (Three Days Grace)
Chilly Gonzales – classical musician
Matthew Good – singer-songwriter (Matthew Good Band)
Myles Goodwyn – singer-songwriter, guitarist (April Wine)
James Gordon – singer-songwriter
Valery Gore – singer-songwriter
Rex Goudie – singer-songwriter (Canadian Idol runner-up, 2005)
Denis Gougeon – composer
Glenn Gould – pianist, composer, philosopher
Robert Goulet – singer
Lawrence Gowan – rock singer (solo, Styx)
Max Graham – house DJ
Tommy Graham – singer
Sebastien Grainger – singer, drummer, percussionist (Death from Above 1979)
Gil Grand – country singer-songwriter
Jenn Grant – singer-songwriter
Dallas Green – singer-songwriter, guitarist (Alexisonfire, City and Colour)
Brian Greenway – guitarist, harmonicist, vocalist (April Wine, Mashmakhan)
Joey Gregorash
Adam Gregory – country musician
Grimes (Claire Boucher) – singer-songwriter, visual artist, music video director
Matthew Grimson – singer-songwriter
Paul Gross – singer, songwriter, actor, producer
Emm Gryner – singer, songwriter, pianist, guitarist
Jean "Guilda" Guida - cabaret pop singer
Molly Guldemond – singer, synthesizer player (Mother Mother)
Ryan Guldemond – singer, songwriter, guitarist (Mother Mother)
Jim Guthrie – singer-songwriter
Trevor Guthrie – singer-songwriter, formerly of SoulDecision
Bruce Guthro – singer-songwriter (lead vocalist of Runrig)
Caity Gyorgy – jazz singer

H

Emily Haines – singer-songwriter (also member of Metric, Emily Haines and the Soft Skeleton and Broken Social Scene)
Nate Haller – country singer-songwriter
Marc-André Hamelin – pianist and composer
Mark Hamilton – frontman of Woodpigeon
Moshe Hammer – violinist
Marie-Lynn Hammond – folk singer
Handsome Ned – country singer
Gerry Hannah – bass player of Subhumans
Barbara Hannigan – soprano, conductor
Lynne Hanson – singer-songwriter
Buster Harding – jazz pianist, composer, arranger
Hagood Hardy – jazz vibraphonist, pianist, known for "The Homecoming"
Georgia Harmer – singer-songwriter
Sarah Harmer – singer-songwriter
Ofra Harnoy – cellist
Barry Harris – dance music DJ, remixer, musician
Robin Harrison – pianist, composer
Corey Hart – singer
Joshua Haulli – singer-songwriter
Ron Hawkins – singer-songwriter
Ronnie Hawkins – American-born singer, naturalized Canadian
Richie Hawtin – techno musician-DJ, producer
Hayden – singer-songwriter, real name Paul Hayden Desser
Oliver Haze – singer-songwriter
Terra Hazelton – jazz singer
Jeff Healey – guitarist, trumpet player, singer
Kevin Hearn – singer-songwriter (Barenaked Ladies)
Tim Hecker - ambient/electronic musician
Coleman Hell – indie pop/electronic musician
Thomas Hellman – jazz/pop singer
Scott Helman – singer-songwriter
Bill Henderson – singer-songwriter (Chilliwack)
Sheila Henig – pianist, soprano
Carl Henry – R&B, reggae musician
Darcy Hepner – saxophonist, composer/arranger
Ben Heppner – operatic tenor
Mikey Heppner – guitarist, singer-songwriter (Priestess)
Angela Hewitt – pianist
Tim Hicks – country singer-songwriter
Jolene Higgins – folk and acoustic blues singer-songwriter known as "Little Miss Higgins"
Rebekah Higgs – singer-songwriter
Dan Hill – pop singer
Warren Hill – smooth jazz musician
Veda Hille – singer-songwriter
Florian Hoefner - jazz pianist
Jacob Hoggard – singer (Hedley)
Steve Holt – pianist, singer-songwriter
Matt Holubowski – singer-songwriter
Amy Honey – singer-songwriter
Jason Hook – guitarist
Charlie Hope – children's musician
Kelly Hoppe – harmonica player, multi-instrumentalist (Big Sugar)
Paul Horn – flute player
Luke Hoskin – guitar player (Protest the Hero)
Gregory Hoskins – singer-songwriter 
Stuart Howe – operatic tenor
Andrew Huang – musician
Andrew Huculiak – drummer (We Are the City)
Garth Hudson – multi-instrumentalist (the Band)
Paul Humphrey – singer-songwriter (Blue Peter)
Alex Zhang Hungtai – indie rock singer-songwriter, performing as Dirty Beaches
Jimmy Hunt – singer-songwriter
Tommy Hunter – singer who had his own CBC TV show
Nate Husser – rapper
Timothy Hutchins – flute player
Andrew Hyatt – country singer
Paul Hyde – singer-songwriter (Payola$)
Ron Hynes – Newfoundland folk singer-songwriter
Hyper-T – rapper
Joshua Hyslop – singer-songwriter

I

Zaki Ibrahim – soul, R&B singer
Norman Iceberg – pop singer
Lucie Idlout – rock singer
Ill-esha – electronic, R&B vocalist, producer, songwriter
Joshua Ingram – rock drummer, percussionist
Chin Injeti – R&B singer
Paolo Iovannone – singer-songwriter, producer
May Irwin – vaudeville singer
Elisapie Isaac – singer-songwriter
Orin Isaacs – bandleader, bass guitarist
iskwē – pop, electronic music singer

J
*Lenni Jabour – pop singer-songwriter
Susan Jacks – pop singer-songwriter
Terry Jacks – pop singer-songwriter, producer
Sammy Jackson – jazz and rhythm and blues singer
Jacynthe – pop singer
Emmanuel Jal – hip hop musician
Colin James – blues and rock musician
Freddie James – R&B singer
John James – dance musician
Ryland James – pop singer
Reid Jamieson – pop and folk singer-songwriter (Vinyl Cafe)
Patti Jannetta – pop and rock singer
Paul Janz – singer-songwriter
Sterling Jarvis – R&B singer, musical theatre actor
Yves Jarvis – indie rock singer-songwriter
JBM (Jesse Marchant) – singer-songwriter
Anik Jean – rock and pop singer
Jelleestone – rapper
Jemeni – hip-hop, R&B singer
Drake Jensen – country singer
Ingrid Jensen – jazz trumpet player
Jeon So-mi – singer-songwriter, former member of I.O.I
Carly Rae Jepsen – singer-songwriter
Berk Jodoin - folk/country singer-songwriter
Mendelson Joe
Lyndon John X – reggae musician
Rita Johns – pop singer
Alexz Johnson – singer-songwriter, actress
Bill Johnson – blues and roots music performer
Carolyn Dawn Johnson – country singer-songwriter
Gordie Johnson – guitar player and singer (Big Sugar)
Martha Johnson – singer-songwriter (Martha and the Muffins)
Molly Johnson – rock and jazz singer
Rick Johnson – rock guitarist, children's entertainer
Taborah Johnson (Tabby Johnson) – jazz and rock singer
France Joli – disco singer
Danko Jones – singer-songwriter
G.B. Jones – guitarist, drummer (Fifth Column)
Jeff Jones – rock bassist, singer
Miles Jones – rapper, singer-songwriter, producer
Oliver Jones – jazz pianist
Jorane – cellist, singer-songwriter
Keven Jordan – pop/rock singer-songwriter
Marc Jordan – singer-songwriter
Sass Jordan – rock singer, judge on Canadian Idol
Michelle Josef – drummer
Leila Bronia Josefowicz – violinist
Martha Joy – singer
Junia-T – rapper

K

Florence K – pop singer-songwriter
K-Anthony – gospel singer
K-Bust – singer-songwriter
Todd Kerns – vocalist/bassist (Slash, Age of Electric) 
Michael Kaeshammer
Connie Kaldor – singer-songwriter, poet
Kamau – hip-hop musician
Kanen – singer-songwriter
KAPRI – dance/pop singer
Kardinal Offishall – rapper
Kaia Kater – singer-songwriter
Cevin Key – songwriter, producer, and composer
Ethan Kath – producer (Crystal Castles)
Kathleen – Quebec pop singer
Katie B – singer-songwriter (formerly with Jakalope)
John Kay – singer (Steppenwolf)
Kaya – rock and pop singer, formerly known as Francis Martin
Kaytranada – electronic
Sherry Kean
James Keelaghan – singer-songwriter
Jesse F. Keeler – Death from Above 1979, MSTRKRFT
Greg Keelor – singer-songwriter, guitarist (Blue Rodeo, solo artist)
Simeonie Keenainak – accordionist
Joey Keithley – also known as Joey Shithead, Vancouver punk rock singer, guitarist (D.O.A.), political and environmental activist
Geoffrey Kelly – Celtic-folk musician, singer (Spirit of the West, the Paperboys)
Sean Kelly – singer, guitarist (Crash Kelly)
Roy Kenner – singer-songwriter
Mo Kenney – singer-songwriter
Lydia Képinski – singer-songwriter
Cassius Khan – ghazal player, tabla player, Indian classical musician
Rich Kidd – hip hop artist
Brett Kissel – country singer
Kid Koala – hip-hop artist
Kiesza (Kiesa Rae Ellestad) – singer-songwriter
Andy Kim – singer-songwriter, pop musician ("Sugar, Sugar")
Kiva – harmonic overtone singer, keyboardist, worldbeat/jazz artist
Bryden Gwiss Kiwenzie – dance music
Francois Klark - pop singer-songwriter
Trish Klein – folk music guitarist, singer-songwriter (the Be Good Tanyas)
Billy Klippert – rock musician
K.Maro – R&B, rap musician, producer
K'naan – rapper
Aidan Knight – singer-songwriter
Chester Knight – singer-songwriter
Moe Koffman – jazz artist
Gwendolyn Koldofsky – piano accompanist and music educator
Ron Korb – composer, flutist
Koriass – rapper
k-os – rapper, hip-hop musician
Keith Kouna – punk rock singer
Benjamin Kowalewicz – frontman of Billy Talent
Dan and Ryan Kowarsky – singers (RyanDan and b4-4)
Nik Kozub – bassist (Veal), keyboardist (Shout Out Out Out Out), remixer (the Paronomasiac)
Serouj Kradjian – pianist, composer
Norbert Kraft – guitarist
Diana Krall – jazz singer, pianist
Chantal Kreviazuk – singer-songwriter
Nicholas Krgovich – indie rock, pop singer-songwriter
David Kristian – film composer, electronic musician
Kyrie Kristmanson – singer-songwriter
Chad Kroeger – singer, guitarist, Nickelback
Patricia Krueger – classical pianist with the Toronto Symphony Orchestra
Spencer Krug – singer-songwriter (Fifths of Seven, Frog Eyes, Wolf Parade, Sunset Rubdown, Swan Lake)
Pierre Kwenders – pop/world music singer, rapper
Kyprios – hip-hop musician

L

Jesse Labelle – country singer
James LaBrie – singer-songwriter (Dream Theater)
Kathryn Ladano – bass clarinetist
Elise LeGrow – singer-songwriter
Paul Laine – singer (solo, Danger Danger)
Corky Laing – drummer
Jon Lajoie – comedian, actor, rapper, singer, musician, Internet celebrity
Mary Jane Lamond – Gaelic singer
Willie Lamothe – country singer
Wendy Lands – pop and jazz singer
Tory Lanez – R&B
k.d. lang – country punk singer
Matt Lang – country singer 
Steve Lang – bassist (April Wine, Mashmakhan)
Robert Langevin – flute player
Daniel Lanois – composer, producer
Jessy Lanza – electronic musician
Abigail Lapell – folk singer-songwriter
André Laplante – pianist
Eric Lapointe – rock singer
Pierre Lapointe – pop, rock, funk singer-songwriter
Grit Laskin – folk singer, luthier
Henry Lau – violinist, singer, dancer (Super Junior-M)
Michael Laucke – classical and flamenco guitarist, composer, producer
Carole Laure – pop/folk singer
Laurence-Anne – pop singer
Wayne Lavallee - singer-songwriter, film, television and theatre composer
Avril Lavigne – singer-songwriter, musician, record producer
Daniel Lavoie – singer-songwriter
Barbara Law – pop and rock singer
Grant Lawrence – rock singer, radio personality
Marshall Lawrence – blues, rock
Dorothy Lawson – cellist, composer (ETHEL)
Lisa LeBlanc – singer-songwriter/banjoist
Félix Leclerc – singer-songwriter
Salomé Leclerc – singer-songwriter
Daniel Ledwell – singer-songwriter, record producer, keyboardist (In-Flight Safety)
Geddy Lee – singer, bassist, keyboardist (Rush)
Jess Lee – country singer-songwriter
Mark Lee – rapper, dancer of NCT, NCT 127, and SuperM, NCT Dream
Lee Kum-Sing – classical pianist
Ranee Lee – jazz singer, drummer, tenor saxophonist
Sook-Yin Lee – rock singer-songwriter, broadcaster
Sebastien Lefebvre – guitarist, singer (Simple Plan)
Ray Legere – bluegrass mandolinist and fiddler 
Peter Leitch – jazz guitarist
Jean Leloup – singer-songwriter
Lynda Lemay – singer-songwriter
Michel Lemieux – experimental electronic music, performance art
Hubert Lenoir – rock singer
Exco Levi – reggae singer
Mike Levine – bassist and keyboardist
Andrea Lewis – singer
Glenn Lewis – R&B singer
Larnell Lewis – drummer
Neil Leyton – rock singer and guitarist
Alex Lifeson – guitarist (Rush)
Murray Lightburn – indie-rock singer-songwriter, guitarist
Gordon Lightfoot – singer-songwriter (voted Canada's favourite singer-songwriter)
Terra Lightfoot – singer-songwriter
LIGHTS – singer-songwriter
Andrea Lindsay – singer-songwriter
Aaron Lines – country musician
Bruce Liu – pianist
Liu Fang – pipa player
Guy Lombardo – big-band leader
Celine Lomez – pop singer
Rich London – rapper
Morley Loon – singer-songwriter
Loony – R&B singer
Oscar Lopez – Latin-folk guitarist
Myrna Lorrie – country singer-songwriter ("first lady of Canadian country music")
Louis Lortie – pianist
Loud – rapper
Russell Louder – pop singer, performance artist
Alexina Louie – pianist
Johnnie Lovesin – rock singer
Lowell – electropop singer-songwriter
Larissa Loyva – singer-songwriter
Luba – pop singer
Lederhosen Lucil – singer-songwriter
Zachary Lucky – singer-songwriter
Chris "Old Man" Luedecke – folk singer-songwriter
Todd Lumley – pianist, keyboardist
Sekou Lumumba – drummer
Corb Lund – country singer-songwriter
Rob Lutes – folk/blues singer-songwriter
Loma Lyns – country singer
Lysandre – pop singer-songwriter and pianist

M

Amanda Mabro – singer-songwriter
Mark Masri – tenor singer/gospel composer
Galt MacDermot – composer, musician, wrote the music for Hair
Colin MacDonald – singer, guitarist (the Trews)
Sarah MacDonald – conductor and organist
John-Angus MacDonald – guitarist (the Trews)
Maggie MacDonald – singer, keyboardist (the Hidden Cameras, Kids on TV)
Kris MacFarlane – independent drummer/multi-instrumentalist (Great Big Sea, the Paperboys)
Ryan MacGrath – singer-songwriter
Ashley MacIsaac – violinist
Gisele MacKenzie – singer, violinist
Tara MacLean – singer-songwriter
Catherine MacLellan – singer-songwriter
Gene MacLellan – singer-songwriter
Brian Macleod – songwriter, music producer (best known as a member of Chilliwack and the Headpins)
Buddy MacMaster – violinist
Natalie MacMaster – violinist, stepdancer
Kevin MacMichael – guitarist (Cutting Crew)
Rita MacNeil – country and folk singer
Rozalind MacPhail – singer-songwriter, multi-instrumentalist
Mad Child – rapper
Madagascar Slim – folk and blues guitarist
Ria Mae – singer-songwriter
Maestro Fresh Wes – hip-hop musician, singer of "Let Your Backbone Slide"
Raine Maida – singer (Our Lady Peace)-songwriter, producer
Phyllis Mailing – mezzo-soprano 
Catherine Major – singer-songwriter
Charlie Major – singer-songwriter
Kate Maki – country rock singer-songwriter
Ryan Malcolm – lead singer (Low Level Flight), first Canadian Idol winner
Manafest – hip-hop musician
Dan Mangan – singer-songwriter
Casey Manierka-Quaile (Casey MQ) – electronic musician, songwriter, producer
John Mann – rock singer (Spirit of the West)
Dayna Manning – singer-songwriter
Catherine Manoukian – violinist
Richard Manuel – pianist, vocalist, drummer (the Band)
Richard Margison – operatic tenor
Kristina Maria – pop singer-songwriter
Marie-Mai – singer
Frank Marino – guitarist, singer (Mahogany Rush)
Carolyn Mark – alt-country singer-songwriter
Gerry Markman – rock guitarist (the Lincolns)
Cory Marks – country rock singer-songwriter and guitarist 
Hugh Marsh – violinist
Amanda Marshall – singer-songwriter
Lois Marshall – soprano
Béatrice Martin – singer-songwriter, pianist, also known as Cœur de pirate
Jeff Martin – singer-songwriter (the Tea Party)
Stephanie Martin – singer-songwriter, actress
Mia Martina – pop singer-songwriter
Masia One – rapper
Dutch Mason – blues artist
Jojo Mason – country singer-songwriter
Massari – R&B singer
Ken Masters – rapper
Andrew Matheson – punk rock singer and songwriter
Jake Mathews – country singer-songwriter
André Mathieu – pianist and composer
Matiu – singer-songwriter
Kalle Mattson – folk rock singer-songwriter
Romi Mayes – country singer
Matt Mays – singer-songwriter
Bill McBirnie – jazz/Latin flutist (Extreme Flute)
Maxwell McCabe-Lokos – keyboardist (the Deadly Snakes)
Séan McCann – singer-songwriter, guitarist (Great Big Sea)
Jay McCarrol – composer
Melissa McClelland – singer-songwriter
Jeremiah McDade – composer, saxophonist, Irish whistle (the McDadea)
Solon McDade – composer, bassist (the McDades)
Eileen McGann – folk singer-songwriter
Anna McGarrigle – folk singer-songwriter (Kate & Anna McGarrigle)
Kate McGarrigle – folk singer-songwriter (Kate & Anna McGarrigle)
Jay W. McGee – soul, R&B and hip hop singer/rapper
Blake McGrath – pop singer
Eamon McGrath – singer-songwriter
Mike McKenna – rock/blues guitarist noted for his electric slide playing
Loreena McKennitt – Celtic-inspired musician, vocalist
Chris McKhool – violinist, guitarist, singer (Sultans of String)
Sarah McLachlan – singer-songwriter
Murray McLauchlan – singer-songwriter
Ambre McLean – singer-songwriter, multi-instrumentalist
Kelly McMichael – singer-songwriter
Holly McNarland – singer-songwriter
Suzie McNeil – pop rock singer-songwriter
Trevor McNevan – singer-songwriter (Thousand Foot Krutch, FM Static)
Colin McPhee – classical composer, musicologist
Linda McRae – singer-songwriter (Spirit of the West, solo artist)
Tate McRae – singer-songwriter
Glen Meadmore – punk/rock musician
Michie Mee – rapper
Tom Meikle – singer-songwriter who records as Mappe Of and Forest Moon
Brian Melo – singer (winner of Canadian Idol, 2007)
Shawn Mendes – singer-songwriter, guitarist
Dylan Menzie – singer-songwriter
Jerry Mercer – drummer, vocalist (April Wine, Mashmakhan, the Wackers)
Madeline Merlo – country singer-songwriter
Kathleen Ivaluarjuk Merritt – Inuit throat singer
Scott Merritt – singer-songwriter
Don Messer – fiddler
Patrice Michaud – singer-songwriter
Danny Michel – singer-songwriter, guitarist
Anthony J. Mifsud (Mif) – singer-songwriter (Slash Puppet)
Brandon Mig – pop singer
Haviah Mighty – rapper
Lynn Miles – singer-songwriter
Amy Millan – singer-songwriter (Stars, Broken Social Scene)
Tim Millar – rhythm guitar player (Protest the Hero)
Muriel Millard – singer-songwriter
Derek Miller – blues singer-songwriter, guitarist
Darby Mills – singer (the Headpins)
Frank Mills – pianist
Tyler Joe Miller – country music singer-songwriter
Millimetrik – electronic musician
Kenneth G. Mills – pianist, conductor, composer
Andy Milne – jazz pianist
Matt Minglewood – singer-songwriter, guitarist
Ben Mink – guitarist, violinist (k.d. lang, Geddy Lee, Rush, FM)
Ruth Minnikin – singer-songwriter
Joni Mitchell – folk and jazz artist, painter
Kim Mitchell – guitarist, singer-songwriter, radio personality
Lindsay Mitchell – guitarist, songwriter (Prism)
Taylor Mitchell – singer-songwriter 
Willy Mitchell – singer, guitarist
Mitsou – pop singer
Dave Moffatt – pop/rock keyboardist, singer
Aviva Mongillo – singer, actress
Monsune – electronic musician
Montag – electronic musician
Betty Moon – singer-songwriter
Jacob Moon – singer-songwriter, guitarist
Kevin Moon – singer, main vocalist (the Boyz)
Darren Moore – member of Harlequin, founder of Living Under Venus, writer of themes for Tampa Bay Rays and Toronto Blue Jays
Gil Moore – drummer, vocalist (Triumph)
Katie Moore – singer-songwriter
Mae Moore – singer-songwriter
Rick Moranis – singer, actor
Ryland Moranz – folk/roots singer-songwriter
Carlos Morgan – R&B/soul singer
Jeffrey Morgan – singer-songwriter, rock critic
Alanis Morissette – rock singer
Johannes Moser – cellist
Jess Moskaluke – country pop singer
Mr. Roam – rapper
Geoffrey Moull – conductor, pianist
Art Murphy – singer-songwriter
Chris Murphy – power pop singer-songwriter, bassist (Sloan)
Matt Murphy – singer-songwriter, guitarist (the Super Friendz, the Flashing Lights, The Life and Hard Times of Guy Terrifico)
Anne Murray – country/pop singer
Alannah Myles – rock singer
David Myles – singer-songwriter
Ken Myhr – guitarist, composer

N

Kaveh Nabatian – trumpeter
Bif Naked – punk/pop singer
Nardwuar the Human Serviette
Nancy Nash – blues and pop singer
Narcy – rapper
Nash the Slash – multi-instrumental rock musician (FM)
Nav – rapper
Haydain Neale – soul, R&B, jazz singer-songwriter
Laurence Nerbonne – pop singer
Richard Newell – also known as King Biscuit Boy, blues singer, songwriter, band leader and harmonica player
Carl Newman – guitarist, songwriter (the New Pornographers)
Billy Newton-Davis – R&B, jazz, gospel singer-songwriter
Yannick Nézet-Séguin – conductor
Luke Nicholson – singer-songwriter
Larry Nickel – composer
Dave Nicol – folk singer-songwriter
Chris Nielsen – country singer
Laura Niquay – singer-songwriter
Graph Nobel – hip-hop artist, R&B rapper, singer-songwriter
Sierra Noble – singer-songwriter, fiddler
Bob Nolan – country singer-songwriter (the Sons of the Pioneers)
Faith Nolan – jazz singer-songwriter, guitarist
Safia Nolin – singer-songwriter
Craig Norris – rock singer, radio personality
Craig Northey – rock singer (Odds)
Aldo Nova – rock/pop artist
George Nozuka – singer
Justin Nozuka – singer, writer
Navraj Singh Goraya – rapper, songwriter

O

OBUXUM – record producer
Patricia O'Callaghan – singer
Michael Occhipinti – jazz guitarist
Roberto Occhipinti – jazz/classical bassist
Nivek Ogre – industrial rock singer
Oh Susanna – alternative country singer
Maggie Blue O'Hara – singer, actress, voice artist
Mary Margaret O'Hara – pop/rock singer-songwriter
Jenny Omnichord – indie pop singer-songwriter
Melissa O'Neil – pop singer (winner of Canadian Idol, 2005)
Mike O'Neill – singer-songwriter and guitarist (the Inbreds)
Moka Only – rapper
Maren Ord – pop singer
Johnny Orlando – pop singer
Achilla Orru – lukembé player
Lindi Ortega – singer-songwriter
Robyn Ottolini – country singer-songwriter
Walter Ostanek – polka musician, accordionist
John Oswald – composer
Karim Ouellet – pop singer-songwriter
Peter Oundjian – violinist, conductor
Ouri – electronic-classical fusion composer

P

Dorothea Paas – singer-songwriter
Steven Page – singer-songwriter (formerly with the Barenaked Ladies)
Michel Pagliaro – bilingual singer, songwriter, guitarist
Doug Paisley – singer-songwriter
Owen Pallett – indie pop singer, violinist (Final Fantasy)
Bruce Palmer – bassist (Buffalo Springfield)
Alex Pangman – jazz singer
Charlie Panigoniak – Inuit singer-songwriter, guitarist
Gabrielle Papillon – singer-songwriter
Parichay – Bollywood/ Hip Hop/ R&B and Pop music producer and artist
Sarina Paris – techno singer
Jon Kimura Parker – classical pianist
Kathleen Parlow – classical violinist
Evalyn Parry – folk singer-songwriter
Mark Parry – guitarist
Samantha Parton – folk music multi-instrumentalist singer-songwriter (the Be Good Tanyas)
Night Lovell – hip hop musician/rapper, songwriter
PartyNextDoor – rapper
Meghan Patrick – country singer
Shan Vincent de Paul – pop/electronic/hip hop singer
Trevor W. Payne – gospel and R&B singer, composer
Matt Paxton – singer-songwriter
Peaches – electroclash/dance punk singer-songwriter, multi-instrumentalist
Ryan Peake – guitarist (Nickelback)
Neil Peart – drummer, percussionist, lyricist (Rush)
Orville Peck – country musician
Klô Pelgag – pop singer-songwriter
Bruno Pelletier – singer-songwriter
Fred Pellerin – folk singer
Fred Penner – children's music performer
Patrick Pentland – power pop singer-songwriter, guitarist (Sloan)
Yann Perreau – electro-rock musician
Anjulie Persaud – singer-songwriter
Colleen Peterson – country singer-songwriter
Oscar Peterson – jazz pianist
Billy Pettinger – singer-songwriter
Lou Phelps – rapper
Philémon Cimon – singer-songwriter
Stu Phillips – country singer
Pascale Picard – singer
Scott-Pien Picard – singer-songwriter
Paul Piché – singer
Jason Pierce – drummer (Our Lady Peace)
Lido Pimienta – electronic pop singer and producer
Nestor Pistor – country singer/comedy musician
Louise Pitre – musical theatre actor
Dany Placard – singer-songwriter
Bill Plaskett – folk/rock/jazz musician
Joel Plaskett – alternative rock musician
Jason Plumb – singer-songwriter
Poizunus – DJ, human beatbox
Steve Poltz – singer-songwriter (known for collaboration with Jewel)
Carole Pope – new wave rock/pop singer
Kalan Porter – singer-songwriter (winner of Canadian Idol, 2004)
Shelley Posen – folklorist, songwriter
Catherine Potter – bansuri
Roxanne Potvin – blues singer-songwriter
Blake Pouliot – violinist
Tom Power – folk musician
Daniel Powter – singer-songwriter
Pressa – rapper
Garth Prince – children's entertainer
William Prince – singer-songwriter
Peter Pringle – pop and jazz singer, pianist, theremin player
Promise – hip-hop rapper, singer-songwriter
ThePropheC – singer-songwriter, producer
P'tit Belliveau 
Adonis Puentes – jazz, world music
Don Pyle – drummer (Shadowy Men on a Shadowy Planet, Fifth Column)

Q

Q052 – rapper
Charlotte Angugaattiaq Qamaniq – Inuit throat singer
Quanteisha – singer
Sara Quin – singer-songwriter, producer (Tegan and Sara)
Tegan Quin – singer-songwriter, producer (Tegan and Sara)

R

Raffi – folk/pop singer-songwriter
Billy Raffoul – rock singer, songwriter
Iceis Rain – pop/rock singer
Ralph – singer-songwriter
Alcvin Ramos – shakuhachi player (solo and ensemble)
Josh Ramsay – singer-songwriter, guitarist, pianist Marianas Trench
Jan Randall – film composer
Luv Randhawa – bhangra singer
Allan Rayman – rhythm and blues singer
Corin Raymond – singer-songwriter
Richard Raymond – pianist
Savannah Ré – soul/rhythm and blues singer
Lee Reed – rapper
Josh Reichmann – singer-songwriter (Tangiers, Jewish Legend)
Alyssa Reid – pop singer-songwriter
Noah Reid – singer-songwriter
Colleen Rennison – singer (No Sinner)
Ginette Reno – singer
Mike Reno – singer (Loverboy)
Jessie Reyez – singer
Donn Reynolds – yodeler; folk and country singer-songwriter
Isabelle Rezazadeh – DJ and record producer (Rezz)
Amanda Rheaume - folk singer-songwriter
Kyle Riabko – singer, guitarist
Alejandra Ribera – pop and jazz singer-songwriter
Jackie Richardson – blues, jazz and gospel singer
Sébastien Ricard – rapper (Loco Locass), actor
Charles Richard-Hamelin - pianist
Kim Richardson – pop, blues, jazz and gospel singer
River Tiber – rhythm and blues musician
Jesse Rivest – singer-songwriter
Ian Robb – folk musician
Vincent Roberge – indie-pop singer
Brad Roberts – singer (Crash Test Dummies)
Sam Roberts – rock musician
Ed Robertson – singer-songwriter (Barenaked Ladies)
Robbie Robertson – guitarist, singer (the Band)-songwriter
Alex J. Robinson – country singer-songwriter
Damien Robitaille – musician
Bob Rock – singer-songwriter (Payola$), producer (Metallica)
Andrew Rodriguez – singer-songwriter
Garnet Rogers – singer-songwriter
Kate Rogers – singer-songwriter
Nathan Rogers – singer-songwriter
Stan Rogers – folk musician
Daniel Romano – folk, country and indie rock musician
Don Ross – fingerstyle guitarist, musician, composer
Josh Ross – country singer and songwriter
Lukas Rossi – singer-songwriter, winner of Rockstar: Supernova
Adolphe-Basile Routhier – lyricist of the original French version of the Canadian national anthem "O Canada"
Ariane Roy – pop singer-songwriter
Jonathan Roy – pop singer-songwriter
Spookey Ruben – singer-songwriter
Paul Rudolph – guitarist, singer-songwriter (Pink Fairies, Hawkwind, Brian Eno)
Brenda Russell – singer-songwriter, keyboardist
Justin Rutledge – alt-country singer-songwriter
Deric Ruttan – country singer-songwriter
Serena Ryder – folk/pop singer-songwriter

S

Shakura S'Aida – blues/jazz singer-songwriter
Julien Sagot – percussionist, singer-songwriter
Martine St-Clair – pop singer
Buffy Sainte-Marie – singer, songwriter, artist, activist
Samian – rapper
Gordie Sampson – blues, rock singer
Lance "Aquakultre" Sampson – soul, R&B singer and rapper
John K. Samson – indie rock singer and songwriter (the Weakerthans)
Chase Sanborn – jazz trumpeter
Curtis Santiago – dance rock singer-songwriter
Ivana Santilli – R&B singer
Sarahmée – rapper
SATE - rock singer
Saukrates – rapper
Andrew Scott – power pop singer-songwriter, drummer (Sloan)
Jack Scott – rock and roll singer
Jay Scøtt - folk/hip hop singer-songwriter
Jennifer Scott – jazz singer, pianist
Joyce Seamone – country singer
Jonathan Seet – singer-songwriter
Lorraine Segato – singer-songwriter
Jacques Kuba Séguin – jazz trumpeter
Jay Semko – singer-songwriter, bassist
Ron Sexsmith – singer-songwriter
Shad – rapper
Paul Shaffer – musical director
Remy Shand – R&B/soul singer
Jackie Shane – R&B singer
Andy Shauf – singer-songwriter
Shauit – singer-songwriter
Bernie Shaw – rock singer (Uriah Heep)
Graham Shaw – rock singer, television composer
James Shaw – guitarist (Metric)
Tyler Shaw – singer-songwriter, cinematic composer
Crystal Shawanda – country singer
Shay Lia – singer
Shiloh – pop singer-songwriter
Shingoose – singer-songwriter
Stefie Shock – pop and funk singer-songwriter
Gabrielle Shonk – singer-songwriter
Howard Shore – composer (The Lord of the Rings trilogy and films of David Cronenberg)
Shotgun Jimmie – singer-songwriter
Edythe Shuttleworth – mezzo-soprano
Ali Siadat – drummer (Mother Mother)
Rosemary Siemens – violinist, vocalist 
Jane Siberry – singer-songwriter
Lucas Silveira – rock singer, guitarist
Liberty Silver – R&B singer
Marie-Josée Simard – percussionist
Nathalie Simard – pop singer
René Simard – pop singer
Denis Simpson – singer
Shane Simpson – guitarist, singer-songwriter
Dylan Sinclair – rhythm and blues singer
Zal Sissokho – Kora) player, Griot
Sister Ray – singer-songwriter
Sixtoo – hip-hop DJ and MC
Ken Skinner – pianist/composer, record producer
Amy Sky – singer-songwriter
Slakah the Beatchild – soul and R&B singer, record producer
Sarah Slean – singer-songwriter, pianist
Alberta Slim – country music singer
Tannis Slimmon – folk singer-songwriter
Henry Small – singer-songwriter, radio personality
Dallas Smith – rock/country singer-songwriter
Laura Smith – folk singer
Maybe Smith – indie pop singer-songwriter
Meaghan Smith – singer
R. Harlan Smith – country singer
Samantha Savage Smith – singer-songwriter
Dan Snaith – songwriter
Floyd Sneed – rock drummer
Bob Snider – folk singer-songwriter
Jason Sniderman – keyboardist (Blue Peter)
Snow – reggae/rap/pop musician
Hank Snow – country and western singer
So Sus – electronic musician
Bryce Soderberg – bassist (Lifehouse)
Viviana Sofronitsky – pianist
Ana Sokolovic – composer
Theresa Sokyrka – singer (Canadian Idol semi-finalist, 2004)
Solitair – rapper
Lenny Solomon – pop and jazz singer
Maribeth Solomon – songwriter, composer
Aaron Solowoniuk – drummer (Billy Talent)
Harry Somers – composer
SonReal – rapper
Martina Sorbara – folk-pop singer
Jay Sparrow – rock singer-songwriter
Spek Won – rapper
Kevin Spencer – multi-instrumentalist, songwriter, producer
Spirit – guitarist and singer-songwriter
Rae Spoon – folk/indie singer-songwriter
Tony "Wild T" Springer – blues-rock guitarist
Frederick Squire – rock singer, guitarist (Shotgun & Jaybird)
Glen Stace – rock singer
Leeroy Stagger – singer-songwriter
Ethel Stark – violinist and conductor
Erroll Starr – rhythm and blues singer
Kinnie Starr – singer-songwriter
Lucille Starr – singer
Cassie Steele – singer-songwriter, actress
Chrissy Steele – rock singer
Emily Steinwall – singer, composer, saxophonist
Katie Stelmanis – singer-songwriter
Ian Stephens – punk rock musician
Martin Stevens – disco singer
Tyler Stewart – drummer
Craig Stickland – singer-songwriter
Jeff Stinco – singer-songwriter and rhythm-guitarist (Simple Plan)
Georgina Stirling – singer
Andy Stochansky – singer-songwriter, drummer (former drummer for Ani DiFranco)
Kim Stockwood – singer
Jayme Stone – banjoist, composer
Miranda Stone – singer-songwriter
Storry – pop, R&B singer-songwriter
Charlie Storwick – singer-songwriter
Amanda Stott – singer
Jeffery Straker – singer-songwriter
Byron Stroud – bassist (Strapping Young Lad, Fear Factory)
Mark Sultan – singer-songwriter, Sultan Records founder
Harold Sumberg – violinist
Cree Summer – rock/alternative singer
Richard Summerbell – singer-songwriter
Leonard Sumner – singer-songwriter
Terry Sumsion – country singer
Michelle Sweeney – jazz singer
Skye Sweetnam – singer-songwriter
Tomi Swick – singer-songwriter
Ember Swift – singer-songwriter
Kurt Swinghammer – singer-songwriter

T

2Rude – hip hop/R&B record producer
Tablo – rapper (Epik High)
Tanya Tagaq – Inuit throat singer, folk singer
Talk – indie rock singer
Tamia – R&B singer
Theo Tams – singer-songwriter (winner of Canadian Idol, 2008)
Eva Tanguay – vaudeville singer
Chaim Tannenbaum – folk singer
Tariq – singer-songwriter, radio personality
Tasha the Amazon – rapper
Bobby Taylor – R&B singer-songwriter
Dione Taylor – jazz singer
Julian Taylor – rock singer
R. Dean Taylor – singer-songwriter, producer for Motown
Lydia Taylor – rock singer
Tebey – country singer-songwriter
Tegan and Sara (band) – pop, indie pop, indie folk, synthpop, indie rock singer-songwriter
Mark Templeton – electro-acoustic musician
The Tenors – vocal trio tenor musician operatic gospel pop
Marie-Jo Thério – singer-songwriter
David Thibault – singer
David Clayton Thomas – singer (Blood, Sweat & Tears)
Ian Thomas – singer-songwriter, actor, author
T. Thomason – singer-songwriter
Don Thompson – jazz musician
Jamie Thompson – drummer, beat-maker
Nicholas Thorburn – frontman for Islands
Ian Thornley – singer-songwriter
Willie Thrasher – Inuit singer-songwriter
Thrust – rapper
Georges Thurston – soul singer
Martin Tielli – singer-songwriter (Rheostatics)
Margo Timmins – singer (Cowboy Junkies)
Tire le coyote – singer-songwriter
Brent Titcomb – musician, actor
Liam Titcomb – singer-songwriter
Ken Tobias – singer-songwriter
Maylee Todd – pop singer
Yvette Tollar – jazz singer, composer
Henri Tomasi – composer and conductor
Töme – reggae singer
Morgan Toney - folk singer-songwriter and fiddler
Tor – electronic musician
Marie-Chantal Toupin – Francophone pop singer
Theresa Tova – musical theatre actress
Tenille Townes - country singer-songwriter
Devin Townsend – multi-instrumentalist, metal guitarist, songwriter
Pete Traynor – rock guitarist and bassist, designer of Traynor Amplifiers
Pat Travers – rock guitarist
Tre Mission – rapper
Lucie Blue Tremblay – folk singer-songwriter
Domenic Troiano – guitarist
Valerie Tryon – pianist
Cynthia Johnston Turner – conductor
Kreesha Turner – R&B singer
Shania Twain – country/pop singer
Jessica Tyler – singer-songwriter and actress
Ian Tyson – folk singer
Sylvia Tyson – singer-songwriter, guitarist

U

Dave Ullrich – drummer, singer (the Inbreds, Egger)
Shari Ulrich – folk rock singer-songwriter
UpsideDown – DJ, producer
David Usher – rock singer-songwriter (Moist)
Terry Uyarak – singer-songwriter

V

Mathew V – pop singer
Vaï – hip-hop singer
Elizabeth Anka Vajagic – post-rock singer, guitarist
Valdy – singer-songwriter
Gilles Valiquette – rock singer, guitarist
Jim Vallance – songwriter, multi-instrumentalist
Rosie Valland – pop singer-songwriter
Diyet van Lieshout – singer-songwriter
Randy Vancourt – pop singer-songwriter, theatre and TV composer
Chad VanGaalen – singer-songwriter
Vanity – singer, model
Gino Vannelli – rock singer
Chris Velan – pop and rock singer-songwriter
Alx Veliz – singer-songwriter
Stéphane Venne – songwriter and composer
Reg Vermue – singer-songwriter ("Gentleman Reg")
Tim Vesely – singer, guitarist (Rheostatics)
Jon Vickers – operatic tenor
Daniel Victor – rock musician (Neverending White Lights)
Gilles Vigneault – singer-songwriter
Annie Villeneuve – singer-songwriter
Suzie Vinnick – folk and blues singer-songwriter, guitarist
Laura Vinson – country singer-songwriter
Jon Vinyl – R&B/soul singer
Virginia to Vegas – singer-songwriter
Claude Vivier – classical composer
Roch Voisine – singer-songwriter
Florent Vollant – aboriginal singer
Leif Vollebekk – singer-songwriter
Brian Vollmer – rock singer (Helix)
Lindy Vopnfjörð – singer-songwriter

W

Martha Wainwright – folk-pop singer
Rufus Wainwright – folk-pop singer
Frank Walker – EDM DJ
Rody Walker – singer (Protest the Hero)
Colter Wall – folk singer
Christopher Ward – songwriter
Chris Wardman – songwriter, guitarist (Blue Peter)
Andy Warren – singer-songwriter
Jackie Washington – blues and folk singer-songwriter, guitarist
Jeff Waters – guitarist and vocalist for heavy metal band Annihilator
Ruby Waters – singer-songwriter
Sneezy Waters – singer-songwriter
Dawn Tyler Watson – blues singer
Patrick Watson – singer-songwriter
Andrée Watters – singer-songwriter
Matt Webb – singer, guitarist
The Weeknd – singer, songwriter, record producer, and actor born Abel Tesfaye
John Welsman – composer, songwriter
Zack Werner – artist, producer, entertainment lawyer, manager
Daniel Wesley – singer-songwriter
Wesli – world music guitarist
Jim West – guitarist for "Weird Al" Yankovic
Phil Western – drummer, programmer (Download)
Dawud Wharnsby-Ali – singer-songwriter
Deryck Whibley – singer-songwriter (Sum 41)
Bill White – composer, choral group leader
Nancy White – singer-songwriter, musical satirist
Portia White – operatic contralto
Rick White – singer-songwriter (Eric's Trip), guitarist
Alissa White-Gluz – metal vocalist and songwriter (Arch Enemy, The Agonist)
Jenny Whiteley – folk and country singer-songwriter
Andrew Whiteman – singer-songwriter, guitarist (Broken Social Scene, Bourbon Tabernacle Choir, Apostle of Hustle)
David Wiffen – folk singer-songwriter
David Wilcox – blues guitarist, singer
Richie Wilcox – singer
Simon Wilcox – singer-songwriter (daughter of David Wilcox)
JJ Wilde – rock singer
Healey Willan – organist, composer
Hal Willis – singer-songwriter
Charlotte Day Wilson – singer-songwriter
Tom Wilson – singer-songwriter
Jesse Winchester – singer-songwriter
Kurt Winter – guitarist, songwriter (the Guess Who)
Bob Wiseman – pianist, songwriter
Karl Wolf – R&B singer-songwriter
Royal Wood – singer-songwriter
Donovan Woods – singer-songwriter
Roy Woods – singer-songwriter, rapper
Hawksley Workman – singer-songwriter
Michelle Wright – country singer-songwriter
Kris Wu – actor, singer-songwriter

Y

Tony Yike Yang – pianist
Nikki Yanovsky – singer
Zal Yanovsky – guitarist, singer (the Lovin' Spoonful)
Francesco Yates – singer-songwriter
Ken Yates – folk singer-songwriter
Lori Yates – country singer
Kathleen Yearwood – singer-songwriter, guitarist
d'bi Young – dub poet
Neil Young – singer-songwriter, guitarist
Catalina Yue – singer-songwriter

Z

Jordon Zadorozny – singer, producer
Zaho – R&B singer
Alfie Zappacosta – singer, actor
Maurice Zbriger – violinist, composer, conductor
Liping Zhang – soprano
Joel Zifkin – electric violinist, songwriter, composer
Jesse Zubot – violinist, composer

See also

List of bands from Canada
List of diamond-certified albums in Canada
 List of Indigenous musicians in Canada

Further reading
 Toomey, Kathleen M., and Stephen Charles Willis. Musicians in Canada: a Bio-bibliographical Finding List. Ottawa, Ont.: Canadian Association of Music Libraries, 1981. N.B.: Title and introductory matter also in French.

References

 
Lists of musicians by nationality